The 1984–85 West Ham United F.C. season was West Ham's fourth season in the First Division since their return in the season 1980–81. The club was managed by John Lyall and the team captain was Billy Bonds.

Season summary
The season started well for West Ham and by the fifth game they were in second place in the league. They maintained moderate form and by the end of 1984 were in 12th place. However their form slumped considerably in 1985 and although they never occupied one of the relegation places, they spent several weeks just one place above. Two wins in the last three games saw them rise to 16th, only two points above a relegation place. Tony Cottee was the top scorer with 24 goals in all competitions. The next highest scorer was Paul Goddard with 14. Cottee also made the most appearance, 49 in all competitions. The season also saw the debut of Steve Potts and the last game for West Ham by Frank Lampard.

League table

Results
West Ham United's score comes first

Legend

Football League First Division

FA Cup

League Cup

Squad

References

West Ham United F.C. seasons
West Ham United
West Ham United
West Ham United